Dastjerdeh (also known as Dastjerd and Deskirdeh) is a village in Siyavashan Rural District, in the Central District of Ashtian County, Markazi Province, Iran. At the 2006 census, its population was 271, in 100 families.

References 

Populated places in Ashtian County